This page details the all-time statistics, records, and other achievements pertaining to the Denver Nuggets.

Individual records

Franchise leaders 
Bold denotes still active with team.

Italic denotes still active but not with team.  

Points scored (regular season) (as of 2021–22 season)

 Alex English (21,645)
 Dan Issel (16,589)
 Carmelo Anthony (13,970)
 David Thompson (11,992)
 Nikola Jokić (10,364)
 Ralph Simpson (10,130)
 Byron Beck (8,602)
 Fat Lever (8,081)
 Mahmoud Abdul-Rauf (7,029)
 Nene Hilario (6,868)
 Kiki Vandeweghe (6,829)
 Will Barton (6,695)
 Antonio McDyess (6,555)
  Dave Robisch (6,181)
 Reggie Williams (5,934)
 Ty Lawson (5,923)
 Larry Jones (5,745)
 Jamal Murray (5,639)
 Michael Adams (5,534)
 Andre Miller (5,354)

Other statistics (regular season)  
(as of 2021–22 season)

Individual awards
NBA Most Valuable Player
Nikola Jokić – 2021, 2022

NBA Defensive Player of the Year
Dikembe Mutombo – 1995
Marcus Camby – 2007

NBA Most Improved Player of the Year
Mahmoud Abdul-Rauf – 1993

NBA Coach of the Year
Doug Moe – 1988
George Karl – 2013

NBA Sportsmanship Award
Chauncey Billups – 2009

J. Walter Kennedy Citizenship Award
Dan Issel – 1985
Alex English – 1988
Kenneth Faried – 2013

NBA Executive of the Year
Vince Boryla – 1985
Mark Warkentien – 2009
Masai Ujiri – 2013

All-NBA First Team
David Thompson – 1977, 1978
Nikola Jokić – 2019, 2021, 2022

All-NBA Second Team
Alex English – 1982, 1983, 1986
Lafayette Lever – 1987
Carmelo Anthony – 2010
Nikola Jokić – 2020

All-NBA Third Team
Antonio McDyess – 1999
Carmelo Anthony – 2006, 2007, 2009
Chauncey Billups – 2009

NBA All-Defensive First Team
Bobby Jones – 1977, 1978
Marcus Camby – 2007, 2008

NBA All-Defensive Second Team
T.R. Dunn – 1983–1985
Bill Hanzlik – 1986
Lafayette Lever – 1988
Dikembe Mutombo – 1995
Marcus Camby – 2005, 2006

NBA All-Rookie First Team
Dikembe Mutombo – 1992
LaPhonso Ellis – 1993
Antonio McDyess – 1996
Nenê – 2003
Carmelo Anthony – 2004
Kenneth Faried – 2012
Nikola Jokić – 2016

NBA All-Rookie Second Team
Mahmoud Abdul-Rauf – 1991
Mark Macon – 1992
Jalen Rose – 1995
Bobby Jackson – 1998
James Posey – 2000
Jusuf Nurkić – 2015
Emmanuel Mudiay – 2016
Jamal Murray – 2017
Bones Hyland – 2022

NBA All-Star Weekend

NBA All-Star Game
Dan Issel – 1977
Bobby Jones – 1977, 1978
David Thompson – 1977, 1978, 1979
George McGinnis – 1979
Alex English – 1982, 1983, 1984, 1985, 1986, 1987, 1988, 1989
Kiki Vandeweghe – 1983, 1984
Calvin Natt – 1985
Fat Lever – 1988, 1990
Dikembe Mutombo – 1992, 1995, 1996
Antonio McDyess – 2001
Carmelo Anthony – 2007, 2008, 2010, 2011
Allen Iverson – 2007, 2008
Chauncey Billups – 2009, 2010
Nikola Jokić – 2019, 2020, 2021, 2022, 2023 

NBA All-Star Game head coach
Larry Brown – 1977
George Karl – 2010
Michael Malone – 2019, 2023

Franchise record for championships

References

records
National Basketball Association accomplishments and records by team